Aviation Drug-Trafficking Control Act of 1984 is a United States Federal law amending the Federal Aviation Act of 1958. The statutory law authorized criminal penalties for the unlawful aerial transportation of controlled substances. The Act of Congress mandated the revocation of aircraft registrations and airman certificates by the Federal Aviation Administration whereas an aircraft aviator knowingly engages in the transit of illicitly used drugs. The Act established authority and a statute of limitations for the reissuance of airman certificates by the United States Secretary of Transportation.

The S. 1146 legislation was passed by the 98th U.S. Congressional session and enacted into law by the 40th President of the United States Ronald Reagan on October 19, 1984.

History

In 1982, the United States created the Operation Bahamas, American, Turks and Caicos (OPBAT) initiative harmonizing an interdiction for the narcotic drug trafficking in the West Indies waters. The Bahamas and Turks and Caicos initiative was a cooperative drug interdiction operation supported by an alliance of federal enforcement organizations as coordinated by;

Federal Anti-Crime Task Force for Southern Florida 
In January 1982, the Reagan Administration established the Federal Anti-Crime Task Force for Southern Florida standardizing a multi-jurisdictional law enforcement organization for confronting organized crime in the Caribbean, Gulf of Mexico, and Southeastern United States. The Florida Counter-drug Task Force developed and governed containment measures for the domestic and international enterprises sustaining illegal drug trade activities in the Lucayan Archipelago and Straits of Florida.

In October 1982, United States President Ronald Reagan made a public announcement from the Great Hall of the Robert F. Kennedy Department of Justice Building. The presidential public declaration addressed the federal initiatives related to the interdiction of drug trafficking and organized crime confronting the United States borders and continental maritime boundaries.

National Narcotics Border Interdiction System 
In March 1983, the Reagan Administration announced the formation of the National Narcotics Border Interdiction System (NNBIS). The National Narcotics Border Interdiction established an air, land, and sea anti-smuggling engagement while supporting the federal controlled substance enforcement operations of the South Florida Task Force.

See also

References

Periodical Bibliography

External links
 
 
  
 
 
 
 
 
 
 
 
 

1984 in law
1984 in aviation
98th United States Congress
Aviation law
United States federal transportation legislation
United States federal controlled substances legislation